Babute is an African dish, effectively a form of meatloaf, originating in the Babute region of the Congo containing ground beef, curry powder and apricots.

See also
 List of African dishes

External links 
Astray Recipes: Babute

African cuisine